Lysinema is a small genus of flowering plants in the family Ericaceae.

The species, which are all endemic to the south west of Western Australia, include:
Lysinema ciliatum R.Br. - Curry Flower
Lysinema conspicuum R.Br.
Lysinema elegans Sond.
Lysinema fimbriatum F.Muell.
Lysinema lasianthum R.Br.
Lysinema pentapetalum R.Br.

The genus was formally described in 1810 by botanist Robert Brown.

References

Epacridoideae
Ericaceae genera